Theliderma stapes, the stirrup shell or stirrupshell, was a species of bivalve in the family Unionidae. It was endemic to eastern Mississippi and western Alabama in the United States.  It was last observed in 1987 and was declared extinct by the US Fish and Wildlife Service in 2021.

Conservation
This species experienced a population collapse primarily due to river modification in the form of canal construction. In 1976, it was predicted that the construction of the Tennessee–Tombigbee Waterway would cause the extinction of this species. This prediction would quickly come to fruition after the waterway was completed in 1984. Freshly dead shells of this species were last observed in 1987 and further surveys have failed to find any evidence of a surviving population.

In 2021, it was proposed to delist this species from the Endangered Species Act. This is done when further efforts to recover a species would almost certainly be futile, and there is no evidence of currently surviving individuals. This species is likely now extinct.

References

stapes
Endemic fauna of the United States
Critically endangered fauna of the United States
Bivalves described in 1831
Taxonomy articles created by Polbot